Hesperodiaptomus is a genus of copepods in the family Diaptomidae, containing 18 species. Two species – Hesperodiaptomus augustaensis and Hesperodiaptomus californiensis – are endemic to the United States and listed as vulnerable species on the IUCN Red List.

It is one of the most diverse genera of freshwater copepods in North and Central America, where its members live in alpine communities.

Species
Hesperodiaptomus arcticus (Marsh, 1920)
Hesperodiaptomus augustaensis (Turner, 1910)
Hesperodiaptomus breweri M. S. Wilson, 1958
Hesperodiaptomus caducus Light, 1938
Hesperodiaptomus californiensis Scanlin & Reid, 1996
Hesperodiaptomus eiseni (Lilljeborg in Guerne & Richard, 1889)
Hesperodiaptomus franciscanus (Lilljeborg in Guerne & Richard, 1889)
Hesperodiaptomus hirsutus M. S. Wilson, 1953
Hesperodiaptomus kenai M. S. Wilson, 1953
Hesperodiaptomus kiseri (Kincaid, 1953)
Hesperodiaptomus morelensis Granados-Ramírez & Suárez-Morales, 2003
Hesperodiaptomus nevadensis Light, 1938
Hesperodiaptomus novemdecimus M. S. Wilson, 1953
Hesperodiaptomus schefferi M. S. Wilson, 1953
Hesperodiaptomus shoshone (S. A. Forbes, 1893)
Hesperodiaptomus victoriaensis (Reed, 1958)
Hesperodiaptomus wardi (Pearse, 1905)
Hesperodiaptomus wilsonae (Reed, 1958)

References

Diaptomidae
Taxonomy articles created by Polbot